Manungu Stadium is a multi-use stadium in Turiani in northern Mvomero District, Tanzania. It is currently used mostly for football matches and serves as the home venue for Mtibwa Sugar FC. It currently holds 5,000 people.

References
Football Ground Map

Football venues in Tanzania